Shukriya: Till Death Do Us Apart (transl. Thank you) is a 2004 film directed by Anupam Sinha, starring Anupam Kher, Aftab Shivdasani, Shriya Saran and Indraneil Sengupta. The movie is an adaptation of the Hollywood film Meet Joe Black (1998).

Plot
Thirty years ago Karam Jindal with his widowed mom, Gayatri, and wife, Sandhya, immigrated to London, England. Shortly thereafter Gayatri gets cancer and dies. Sandhya gives birth to two daughters, Anjali and Sanam. The Jindals accumulate wealth and are now one of the wealthiest families in London.

Anjali marries Akash, while Sanam is on the look-out for her beau. With Karam's 60th birthday coming up, Anjali is busy with preparations for a grand party. Karam hopes to get Sanam married to Yash, his employee, who is like a son to him. Add to that is the inauguration of the "Gayatri Jindal Cancer Hospital" which is to be done on the same day.

With the preparations under way, Karam brings home a young man, Rohan "Ricky" Verma, to live with them for a few days. Sanam has already met him and is quite friendly with him. She confides in her mom that she would like to marry Rohan, and her mother indicates that she approves of him. They get a shock when Karam vehemently opposes any alliance with Rohan, and refuses to divulge the reason. Only Karam knows that Rohan is not who he claims to be – he is Death himself – accompanying Karam during his last four days on Earth.

Cast 
 Anupam Kher as Karam Jindal
 Aftab Shivdasani as Rohan "Ricky" Verma
 Shriya Saran as Sanam K. Jindal
 Indraneil Sengupta as Yash 
 Rati Agnihotri as Sandhya K. Jindal
 Rana Jung Bahadur as Uday R. Jindal
 Anupam Sharma

Music

Songs in this film are Composed by Himesh Reshammiya. A version of "Sohniye", originally by Juggy D and Rishi Rich, also appears in the film.

Track list

References

External links 
 Shukriya on IMDB
 Shukriya on filmibeat

2004 films
Films scored by Himesh Reshammiya
2000s Hindi-language films
2004 drama films
Films scored by Vishal–Shekhar
Indian remakes of American films
Indian drama films
Hindi-language drama films